Al-Noor Sport Club, is an Iraqi football team based in Abu Al-Khaseeb, Basra, that plays in Iraq Division Three.

History
Al-Noor Club was established in 2016 in Abu Al-Khaseeb, Basra. On October 23, 2017, he held his first administrative body election after the end of his constituent body term, where he won the position of club president Safaa Salih.

See also
 2019–20 Iraq FA Cup

References

External links
 Iraq Clubs- Foundation Dates
 Basra Clubs Union

Football clubs in Iraq
2016 establishments in Iraq
Association football clubs established in 2016
Football clubs in Basra
Basra